Ginnum is a small village in Noardeast-Fryslân in the province of Friesland, the Netherlands. It had a population of around 87 in January 2017. Before 2019, the village was part of the Ferwerderadiel municipality.

The village was first mentioned in 1397 as Ghenim, and means "settlement of the people of Gene (person)." The Dutch Reformed church dates from the 12th century and was enlarged in the 13th century. The tower dates from the 15th century. In 1840, Ginnum was home to 124 people.

References

External links

Noardeast-Fryslân
Populated places in Friesland